HK Riga was a Latvian ice hockey team. They played in the 1997-98 Eastern European Hockey League season.

History
The club was founded in 1997, and began playing in the Eastern European Hockey League. Their stay in the EEHL lasted only one year, and the team folded after their first season.

HK Riga finished with an 8-27-1 record, with 82 goals for, and 177 goals against.

Notable players
 Agris Saviels
 Edgars Masaļskis
 Aleksejs Širokovs
 Georgijs Pujacs

References
 1997-98 EEHL season
 HK Riga roster

1997
Defunct ice hockey teams in Latvia
Ice hockey clubs established in 1997